Denia Caballero Ponce (born 13 January 1990) is a Cuban athlete who competes in the discus throw. She has a personal best of 70.65 metres for the event. She won the gold medal at the 2015 and the silver medal at the 2019 World Championships and was the bronze medalist at the 2016 Summer Olympics. Caballero also was the Central American and Caribbean champion in 2011 and the 2011 Pan American Games bronze medallist.

Career
Born in Caibarién, Villa Clara Province, she took part in track and field as a teenager and at the age of eighteen she cleared fifty metres in the javelin for the first time, setting a personal best mark of 52.10 m, and became the Cuban junior champion. Her family have all been involved in sports, her father as a boxer and her mother as a long jumper.  Her uncle, Ricardo Ponce, is a triple jump coach for the Cuban national team. In 2009, she had a succession of personal bests including 56.91 m for fourth at the 2009 ALBA Games and 57.21 m at a meeting in Havana.

Caballero came third at both the Barrientos Memorial and Olimpiada del Deporte Cubano in Havana in 2010 (improving her best mark to 59.30 then 59.92 m). Havana was again the venue for her first throw over sixty metres in 2011, as she had a mark of 60.50 m then won the Barrientos meet a week later with a best of 62.94 m. This earned her a spot at the 2011 World Championships in Athletics and she reached the final round, finishing ninth with a mark of 60.73 m. She had much success regionally that year, winning the gold medal at the 2011 Central American and Caribbean Championships in Athletics, as well as a bronze medal at the 2011 Pan American Games (an event won by fellow Cuban Yarelys Barrios).

A throw of 65.60 m in March 2012 lifted her to fourth in the world rankings and she was later chosen to perform in the discus alongside Barrios in 2012 Cuban Olympic squad.

At the 2013 World Championships, she finished 8th. She won the gold medal at the 2014 Central American and Caribbean Games with a new games record. The record had been set in 1982 by fellow Cuban Maria Betancourt.

In 2015, as well as setting a new personal best, she won the Pan American Games, and produced a shock upset, beating pre-competition favourite Sandra Perkovic to win the World Championship. Caballero was the first Cuban discus thrower to win the World title.

She won the bronze medal at the women's discus throw event at the 2016 Summer Olympics.

Personal bests

Achievements

References

External links

1990 births
Living people
People from Caibarién
Cuban female discus throwers
Olympic athletes of Cuba
Athletes (track and field) at the 2012 Summer Olympics
Athletes (track and field) at the 2016 Summer Olympics
Pan American Games gold medalists for Cuba
Pan American Games bronze medalists for Cuba
Pan American Games medalists in athletics (track and field)
Athletes (track and field) at the 2011 Pan American Games
Athletes (track and field) at the 2015 Pan American Games
Athletes (track and field) at the 2019 Pan American Games
World Athletics Championships athletes for Cuba
World Athletics Championships medalists
Medalists at the 2016 Summer Olympics
Olympic bronze medalists in athletics (track and field)
Olympic bronze medalists for Cuba
Central American and Caribbean Games gold medalists for Cuba
Competitors at the 2014 Central American and Caribbean Games
Competitors at the 2018 Central American and Caribbean Games
World Athletics Championships winners
Central American and Caribbean Games medalists in athletics
Medalists at the 2011 Pan American Games
Medalists at the 2015 Pan American Games
Medalists at the 2019 Pan American Games
Athletes (track and field) at the 2020 Summer Olympics
21st-century Cuban women